The Eagle Spirit Pipeline is a $16B First Nations owned Canadian pipeline proposed by businessman Calvin Helin which would ship oil from Northern Alberta to Prince Rupert, British Columbia.

Background
The Eagle Spirit Pipeline is a proposed alternative to the previous Northern Gateway Pipeline and Trans Mountain Pipeline. Helin claims the project has 100% backing from First Nations groups and carries a low risk in comparison to previous pipeline proposals.

Benefits
The project has the support of 35 First Nations groups, could reduce emissions by 100 megatons and potentially be safer than previous pipeline proposals. The pipeline is estimated to carry 4 million barrels per day of oil and 10 billion cubic feet of natural gas.

Challenges
Current barriers facing the project are National Energy Board approval, and the tanker ban implemented by the Trudeau government and Bill C48.

See also
Trans Mountain Pipeline
Northern Gateway Pipeline

References

Athabasca oil sands
Kinder Morgan
Oil pipelines in Canada
Proposed pipelines in Canada
Pipelines in Alberta
Transport buildings and structures in British Columbia
Justin Trudeau controversies
Political controversies in Canada